Heavy meromyosin (HMM) is the larger of the two fragments obtained from the muscle protein myosin II following limited proteolysis by trypsin or chymotrypsin. HMM contains two domains S-1 and S-2, S-1 contains is the globular head that can bind to actin while the S-2 domain projects at and angle from light meromyosin (LMM) connecting the two meromyosin fragments.

HMM is used to determine the polarity of actin filaments by decorating them with HMM then viewing them under the electron microscope.

References

Motor proteins